The Universal College of Learning (UCOL) is a New Zealand Government ITP (Industry Training Provider/Polytechnic) located primarily in Palmerston North but has campuses also in Whanganui, Masterton and Levin. Dr Linda Sissons is the current Chief Executive.

History
Founded in 1892 as the Palmerston North Technical School, it has seen several name changes over the years becoming the Palmerston North Technical Institute in 1971, the Manawatu Polytechnic in 1983, Universal College of Learning (UCOL) in 1998, and is set to transition to Te Pukenga in 2023. Initially specialised in trade apprenticeship courses, hobby, art, and craft classes, along with a range of night school programmes in business studies for working adults. As successive governments emphasised vocational education, the Polytechnic broadened the courses offered but retained a focus on core vocational programmes. It now delivers Foundation and Certificate programmes, Diplomas, Degrees, Post-Graduate, and Masters options in a range of subjects as well as community-based programmes.

In 1987 the then Manawatǖ Polytechnic opened a small campus in Horowhenua, Levin It focused on horticulture and business programmes between 1987 and 2006, however in 2006, the classes halted due to a nationwide downturn in and an upsurge in PTE (Private Training Establishment) competition.

UCOL expanded in January 2001 with the incorporation of the Masterton Regional Polytechnic. The Masterton Regional Polytechnic was founded in 1869 as the Masterton Technical School. In 1908 it was renamed the Seddon Memorial Technical School and in 1937 it amalgamated with Wairarapa High School to form New Zealand's first co-educational combined school, Wairarapa College. Initially, it specialised in teaching mainly chemistry, cookery, drawing, and dress-making classes. Later on, it offered day classes for high school students alongside its night classes for working adults. In 1988, it became the Wairarapa Community Polytechnic. During the 80's and 90's it followed a philosophy of being 'a polytechnic without walls.' One initiative in 1989 was their trail-blazing computer bus, which toured Wairarapa back roads and gave rural residents the chance to upgrade their computer skills.
  
UCOL expanded further with the integration of the Wanganui Regional Community Polytechnic on 1 April 2002. The Wanganui Regional Community Polytechnic, initially called the Wanganui Technical School of Design, had been launched in 1892. At the time it focused on evening classes in art, geometry, and machine/building construction. In 1911, the renamed Wanganui Technical College started teaching general secondary school courses. In 1964 it became Wanganui Boys' College, as female pupils shifted to the co-ed Wanganui High School. In 1984 the senior technical division of the Boys' College was turned into an organisation of its own right, the Wanganui Regional Community College. Its principal, John Scott, was the first person of Māori descent to head a New Zealand polytechnic. The college's popular summer art school programme was held each January from 1985 to 1994, and attracted up to 300 students. It was the largest programme of its kind in the country. In 1990 the name was changed to the Wanganui Regional Community Polytechnic. John's successor in 1994, Stephen Town, was the country's youngest polytechnic sector head, at age 34.

In mid-2017 UCOL relaunched in Levin, with a focus on helping develop in-demand skills for the local economy. Programmes include construction, carpentry, beauty therapy, health and wellbeing, business admin, early childhood education, and te reo.

On 1 April 2020, UCOL was subsumed into Te Pūkenga – New Zealand Institute of Skills and Technology alongside the 15 other Polytechnics (ITPs) and 11 Institutes of Technology (Industry Training Organisations or ITOs)

Facilities
There are four campuses: Palmerston North, Whanganui, Masterton and Levin.

Palmerston North campus facilities 
 TOEFL iBT Testing Centre
 Ambitions Training Restaurant
 Hair and Beauty Salon
 Palmerston North Weightlifting Club (affiliated with Olympic Weightlifting New Zealand)

Whanganui campus facilities 
 Hair and Beauty Salon

Masterton campus facilities 
 Hair and Beauty Salon

Strategic priorities 
UCOL is focused on delivering the six priorities of the Tertiary Education Strategy 2014–2019.
 Delivering skills for industry
 Getting at-risk young people into a career
 Boosting achievement of Māori and Pasifika
 Improving adult literacy and numeracy
 Strengthening researched-based institutions
 Growing international linkages

Relationships-based teaching 
UCOL is the first to employ a relationships-based teaching approach in a tertiary education setting. Called Te Atakura, the programme was developed with the support of education consultancy Cognition Education Limited and Emeritus Professor Russell Bishop. It is designed to enhance Māori success, develop high performing teaching teams and provide ongoing support services for learners.

Study offerings 
UCOL offers over 100 programmes of study at certificate, diploma, and degree levels in the following subject areas:

 Applied Science (medical imaging, laboratory science, foundation science)
Automotive and Panel & Paint
 Beauty & Hairdressing
 Business (administration, management, project management, accounting, tourism, small business)
 Chef Training & Hospitality
 Construction & Built Environment (furniture design, carpentry & joinery, construction & architecture, infrastructure works, plumbing, gasfitting, & drainlaying)
 Creative (graphic design, motion pictures, animation, fashion design, printmaking, glassmaking, illustration, interior design, music, photography)
 Education (teaching adults, early childhood education)
 Exercise & Sport Science (physical conditioning, sports performance)
 Engineering (mechanical engineering, electrical engineering, fabrication engineering)
 Foundation skills (Māori language, sign language, computing skills, English language, literacy, numeracy)
 Health & Wellbeing (social service, mental health)
 Information Technology (computer networks, software development, business information systems, information & communications technology)
 Language & Culture (English language studies, sign language courses, Māori studies, Samoan language studies)
 Nursing & Enrolled Nursing (nursing)
 Vet Nursing & Animal Care
 In school programmes – part-time study options for high school students seeking to transition into tertiary study whilst attaining NCEA credits.
 Study Online (business, adult education, information technology)

In late 2016 UCOL secured funding from the Tertiary Education Commission's Refugee English Language Fund to give a limited number of eligible refugees the opportunity to study New Zealand Certificate in English at Level 3 or Level 4 free of charge.

Council awards 
Each year UCOL recognises people in the community who have made significant contributions to their local areas and society in general, with the UCOL Council Honours Awards. In 2019 UCOL recognised the contribution of their graduates with their inaugural UCOL Alumni Awards.

References

External links
UCOL web site
Tertiary Education Commission's Refugee English Language Fund

Academic libraries in New Zealand
Buildings and structures in Palmerston North
Buildings and structures in Whanganui
Te Pūkenga – New Zealand Institute of Skills and Technology
Education in Palmerston North
2020 disestablishments in New Zealand